Knutsford services is a motorway service station on the M6 in Cheshire, England.

History

Opened in 1963, Knutsford was one of the country's first motorway service stations. As with many services of the time, there are two sites located on either side of the carriageway, linked by a bridge which features a restaurant and shop. The services are owned by Moto.

The service station has a very short exit slip road, close to the A556 exit slip road on the north-bound side of the M6. Slow moving vehicles are often forced to pull into the main carriageway at slow speeds. The station played a pivotal role in comedian Rhod Gilbert's special Rhod Gilbert and the Award-Winning Mince Pie.

The Cheshire Police Motorway Unit has one of its bases here, situated on the southbound side.

Incidents 
In June 2019, four bikers were stabbed at Knutsford Services, which led to the M6 northbound being closed off for some time between junctions 18 and 19.

Location
The services are located near Knutsford, between junctions 18 and 19 of the M6.

References

External links 

 Moto Official Site - Knutsford
 Motorway Services Trivia Website - Knutsford
 Motorway Services Online - Knutsford

1963 establishments in England
M6 motorway service stations
Moto motorway service stations
Transport in Cheshire
Buildings and structures in Cheshire